Dirk Borgognone (born January 9, 1968) is a former National Football League placekicker who currently holds the record for the longest field goal ever kicked in the history of high school football, 68 yards.

High school career
Borgognone attended Reno High School, initially playing as a soccer player. He soon switched to football and was trained in a "straight-on" kicking style. On Friday, September 27, 1985, he kicked the longest field goal in high school football history, during a game at Sparks High School. The kick measured 68 yards and was longer than any that had ever been successfully kicked in the NFL or the NCAA. Borgognone was thereafter relegated solely to kicks of over 50 yards and missed all eight of his subsequent attempts, failing to make another field goal the rest of his high school career. He would convert three field goals in a subsequent all-star game, being named the game's MVP.

College career
After high school, Borgognone attended the University of Tennessee for a year before he returned to Reno, and Truckee Meadows Community College eventually transferring to the University of the Pacific. Borgognone's college career, however, was derailed by a 1988 change to the NCAA rule books that banned kicking off tees for field goal attempts. This not only reduced the general range for field goals (the record off a tee was 67 yards, without, only 65), but Borgognone had always kicked off a tee and was unprepared for the rule change. Borgognone left college early, to pursue an NFL career as a kickoff specialist.

Professional career
Much like Ove Johansson, whose 69-yard field goal in the NAIA in 1976 is the only field goal on record to have bested Borgognone's high school kick, Borgognone struggled to make the National Football League. He spent years bouncing between NFL training camps, mainly as a kickoff specialist (the NFL had prohibited the use of kicking tees for field goals and extra points for a decade). Dirk received unsuccessful tryouts from the Minnesota Vikings in 1990, the Atlanta Falcons in 1991, the Cleveland Browns in 1992, and the Indianapolis Colts in 1993. Both the Miami Dolphins and Washington Redskins gave him a tryout during the 1994 NFL season, but neither team signed him.  He was picked up by the Green Bay Packers for the 1995 season and was on the roster for two games, filling in for their usual starter Chris Jacke. Borgognone, after a poor tryout for the San Francisco 49ers in 1996, never played professional football again. He briefly considered a football comeback in 1999 at the request of Ray Pelfrey, but, despite feeling physically able to do so, decided against making another run at the NFL.

Personal life
Dirk Borgognone currently lives in Reno, Nevada, and is a widower; his wife, Nevada Highway Patrol officer Kara Kelly-Borgognone, was killed while on duty for the NHP in a car accident on February 25, 2008. Kelly-Borgognone was driving to a location where a bomb was reported—a report that was later determined to be false. Borgognone has two children.

References

1968 births
Living people
People from Elko, Nevada
Players of American football from Nevada
American football placekickers
Pacific Tigers football players
Tennessee Volunteers football players
Green Bay Packers players
Sportspeople from Reno, Nevada